Jhonatan Luz dos Santos (born February 10, 1987) is a Brazilian professional basketball player. He currently plays with Franca of the Novo Basquete Brasil (NBB) from Brazil.

Professional career

NBB career statistics

Regular season

Playoffs

References

External links
 NBB Player Profile 

1987 births
Living people
Brazilian men's basketball players
Associação Limeirense de Basquete players
Franca Basquetebol Clube players
Sociedade Esportiva Palmeiras basketball players
Club Athletico Paulistano basketball players
Flamengo basketball players
Novo Basquete Brasil players
Small forwards
People from Osasco
Sportspeople from São Paulo (state)